This is a list of former employees of the professional mixed martial arts promotion ONE Championship (previously known as ONE Fighting Championship and ONE FC). The fighters are listed in order by weight class.

Alumni (Mixed Martial Arts)

Alumni (Kickboxing & Muay Thai)

See also
 List of current ONE fighters
 List of ONE Championship champions
 List of ONE Championship events

References

External links 
ONE Championship

ONE Championship
Lists of kickboxers
Lists of mixed martial artists